This was the first edition of the tournament.

Guido Andreozzi won the title after defeating Simone Bolelli 3–6, 6–4, 6–3 in the final.

Seeds

Draw

Finals

Top half

Bottom half

References
Main Draw
Qualifying Draw

2018 ATP Challenger Tour
2018 Singles